The Antiqua maneria (ancient manors), or assessionable manors, were the original 17 manors belonging to the Earldom of Cornwall.

After March 1337 these manors passed to the new Duchy of Cornwall which was created by King Edward III  to give financial support to his son Edward, the Black Prince (1330–1376). These manors were known as assessionable manors as the manors were to lease under assession leases periodically.

The table below shows the 17 Antiqua maneria including the number and status of Customary tenants in the early fourteenth century: the manors vary greatly in size and importance. The parishes stated are the modern parishes rather than those in existence in the 14th century.

Table of customary tenants in the early fourteenth century
Conventionarii = Conventionary tenants; Villani = Villeins; Nativi = Villeins; Liberi Conventionarii = Free tenants; Nativi Conventionarii = Conventionary tenants; Nativi de Stipite = Villeins by descent

See also

 Royal charters applying to Cornwall

References

Payton, Philip. Cornwall: a History. 
Rowse, A. L. (1945). The Duchy of Cornwall

Geography of Cornwall
Medieval Cornwall
Manors in Cornwall
Cornwall-related lists